|}

The Loughbrown Stakes is a Group 3 flat horse race in Ireland open to thoroughbreds aged three years or older. It is run at the Curragh over a distance of 2 miles (3,219 metres), and it is scheduled to take place each year in September.

The race was first run in 2013 as a Listed race.  Prior to that the name was associated with a seven furlongs race now replaced in the calendar by the Patton Stakes. It was upgraded to Group 3 status in 2017.

Winners

See also
Horse racing in Ireland
 List of Irish flat horse races

References

Racing Post:

 ifhaonline.org – International Federation of Horseracing Authorities – Loughbrown Stakes (2019).

Flat races in Ireland
Curragh Racecourse
Open long distance horse races
Recurring sporting events established in 2013
2013 establishments in Ireland